Wisconsin gubernatorial elections are held on the first Tuesday after the first Monday of November every four years on even, non-presidential election years since 1970. Between 1884 and 1970, gubernatorial elections were held on every even-numbered year.  Prior to 1882, gubernatorial elections were held on every odd-numbered year.

The Wisconsin gubernatorial election selects the Governor of Wisconsin and Lieutenant Governor of Wisconsin who will take office for a four-year term beginning the first Monday of the first January following the election.  The election operates under first-past-the-post rules with no runoff.  Prior to 2014, the lieutenant gubernatorial election was a separate election on the same ballot.

The first Wisconsin gubernatorial election was held May 8, 1848, concurrent with a referendum to ratify the Wisconsin Constitution.  Since then, there have been 74 regular Wisconsin gubernatorial elections and one special recall election.  

Fifty-five elections have been won by Republican candidates.  Seventeen elections were won by Democratic candidates. Three were won by Wisconsin Progressives.  One was won by a Whig.  

Incumbents have been re-elected 35 times and have been defeated 14 times.

List of election results

Percentages are approximate:

^ Recall election

References
 http://politicalgraveyard.com/geo/WI/ofc/gov1950s.html
 2005-2006 Wisconsin Bluebook

 
Quadrennial elections
Elections